is a multi-directional shooter video game for the Family Computer produced and published in 1985 by Namco. It is a successor to Namco's 1980 Tank Battalion, and would be succeeded itself by the 1991 Tank Force.

An arcade version for the Nintendo VS. System would follow, and the game would eventually end up with the Virtual Console release for the Wii and Wii U. There was also a related Game Boy game of the same name dating back to 1991, which was developed and published by Nova Games.

Gameplay
The player controls a tank and shoot projectiles to destroy enemy tanks around the playfield. The enemy tanks enter from the top of the screen and attempt to destroy the player's base (represented on the screen as a phoenix symbol), as well as the player's tank itself. A level is completed when the player destroys 20 enemy tanks, but the game ends if the player's base is destroyed or the player loses all available lives. Note that the player can destroy the base as well, so the player can still lose even after all enemy tanks are destroyed.

Battle City contains 35 different stages that are 13 units wide by 13 units high. Each map contains different types of terrain and obstacles. Examples include brick walls that can be destroyed by having either the player's tank or an enemy tank shoot at them, steel walls that can be destroyed by the player if they have collected three stars, bushes that hide tanks under them, ice fields that make it difficult to control the tank and patches of water which cannot be crossed by tanks. The game becomes more challenging in later levels, as enemy tanks may act as decoys to lure players away from their base so that another tank can destroy it. In addition, flashing red tanks releases a random power-up when destroyed. There are several types of power-ups, such as a clock that stops all enemies, a protective shield, and a bomb that eliminates all on-screen enemies. The enemy tanks come in four different sizes, with the largest one requiring four shots to destroy.

Reception

Notes

References

External links
 

1985 video games
Cooperative video games
Game Boy games
FM-7 games
Namco games
Nintendo Entertainment System games
Nintendo Vs. Series games
Sharp MZ games
Sharp X1 games
Shoot 'em ups
Video games developed in Japan
Virtual Console games
Virtual Console games for Wii U
Multiplayer and single-player video games
Head-to-head arcade video games
Tank simulation video games